Help, I Love Twins is a 1969 West German comedy film directed by Peter Weck and starring Roy Black, Uschi Glas, and Eddi Arent.

It was shot around Wörthersee in Austria.

Synopsis
A photographer receives an assignment to photography a top film star while she on holiday. Confusingly, however, her twin sister works at the hotel where she is staying.

Cast

References

Bibliography

External links 
 

1969 films
1969 comedy films
German comedy films
West German films
1960s German-language films
Films directed by Peter Weck
Films scored by Gerhard Heinz
Gloria Film films
Films shot in Austria
Films about twin sisters
1960s German films